Dauren Askerbekuly Abaev (born 18 April 1979) is a Kazakh politician, who served as a Minister of Culture and Sports from 2022 to 2023. Since March 2023, Deputy Secretary General of the CIS.

Biography
Abaev was born in the Almaty Region in 1979.

He graduated from Al-Farabi Kazakh National University in 2001. In 2006, Abaev completed his studies at Leiden University. In 2014, while serving as Press Secretary, he finished the Eurasian Humanitarian Institute.

Political career
From 2001 to 2003, he worked in various positions in the central office of the Ministry of Foreign Affairs occupying as the referent, attache, and the third secretary.

In May 2007, he became the head of the Press Service Department of the Ministry of Foreign Affairs. 
From December 2007 to December 2008, Abaev was a chief expert, consultant to the Protocol of the President.
In December 2008, he became a Deputy Press Secretary of the President.
From October 2009 to 2011, Abaev was a State Inspector of the Department of State Control and Organizational and Territorial Work of the Administration.

From 6 October 2011 to 6 May 2016, he was the Press Secretary of the President, as well as an Advisor to the Head of State. 

On 6 May 2016, by a presidential decree, Abaev was appointed Head of the new Ministry of Information and Communications that was established due to the 2016 Kazakh protests.

From 25 February 2019 to 4 May 2020, Abaev served as the Minister of Information and Social Development. 

On 4 May 2020 to 11 January 2022, he was appointed as the First Deputy Head of the Presidential Administration.

From 11 January 2022 to 4 January 2023 - Minister of Culture and Sports of the Republic of Kazakhstan.

Diplomatic career
In 2003, he was the Third Secretary of the Kazakhstan Embassy in Azerbaijan.

From 2003 to 2007, Abaev served as a Second Secretary, as well as the chargé d'affaires of Kazakhstan in the Netherlands

He has a diplomatic rank - the first secretary of the 1st class.

On March 2, 2023, he was appointed Deputy Secretary General of the CIS.

References

1979 births
Living people
Kazakhstani politicians
People from Almaty Region
Al-Farabi Kazakh National University alumni